Diosmetin, also known as 5,7,3′-trihydroxy-4′-methoxyflavone, is an O-methylated flavone, a chemical compound that can be found in the Caucasian vetch.

It has been found to act as a weak TrkB receptor agonist.

Glycosides
Diosmetin is the  aglycone of diosmin.

See also
 Tropomyosin receptor kinase B § Agonists

References

O-methylated flavones
Resorcinols
TrkB agonists
3-Hydroxypropenals within hydroxyquinones